Huddersfield Town's 1995–96 campaign was Town's first season in the second tier since the 1987-88 season. They finished in 8th place, just 8 points and 2 places below the play-offs.

The closed season saw the departure of the hugely successful strike partnership of Andy Booth and Ronnie Jepson, whose goals had been vital to Huddersfield's success in the previous two seasons. Booth left for Premier League club Sheffield Wednesday in a club record £2.7 million deal while Jepson left to 2nd Division Bury on a free transfer. Horton invested the money in the prolific Bristol Rovers striker Marcus Stewart (for a club record £1.2 million), Barnsley's Andy Payton (£350,000) and Blackpool defender Andy Morrison (£500,000).

Squad at the start of the season

Review
Following Town's promotion the previous season, many were surprised that manager Neil Warnock resigned to become manager of Plymouth Argyle. A few days later, the ex-Manchester City and Oxford United manager Brian Horton was hired as his replacement. They had a bad start to the season, losing 3–0 to local rivals Oldham Athletic at Boundary Park, but they managed to recover with convincing wins against Watford, Birmingham City, Charlton Athletic and Ipswich Town soon set Town players and fans alight.

Town did have a good middle part of the season, going on a run of only 2 losses in 19 league games losing only to Port Vale and eventual champions Derby County. They also put on a good run in the FA Cup, which saw them reach the last 16 for the first time since the 1971-72 season. They eventually lost in a replay to Premier League side Wimbledon.

Town seemed to be on course for a play-off spot, but the end of the season saw Town lose 8 of their last 13 games, winning only 3 of them. They finished in 8th place, but a better end to the season might have seen Town get nearer to the play-offs for the Premier League.

Squad at the end of the season

Results

Division One

FA Cup

League Cup

Appearances and goals

1995-96
Hudd